The 2018–19 Fulham season was the club's 121st professional season and their 14th in the Premier League, after the club won promotion from the EFL Championship after defeating Aston Villa in the 2018 EFL Championship play-off Final at Wembley Stadium on 26 May 2018. The club also competed in the FA Cup and the EFL Cup.

Kits

Players

Transfers

Transfers in

Loans in

André Schürrle's loan ended early when Fulham were relegated in 2019.

Transfers out

Loans out

Friendlies
Fulham confirmed friendlies against Crawley Town, Reading, Fenerbahçe, Lyon, Sampdoria and Celta de Vigo.

Competitions

Premier League

League table

Results summary

Results by matchday

Matches
On 14 June 2018, the Premier League fixtures for the forthcoming season were announced.

FA Cup
The third round draw was made live on BBC by Ruud Gullit and Paul Ince from Stamford Bridge on 3 December 2018.

EFL Cup
The second round draw was made from the Stadium of Light on 16 August. The third round draw was made on 30 August 2018 by David Seaman and Joleon Lescott. The fourth round draw was made live on Quest by Rachel Yankey and Rachel Riley on 29 September.

Squad statistics

Appearances and goals

|-
! colspan=14 style=background:#dcdcdc; text-align:center| Goalkeepers

|-
! colspan=14 style=background:#dcdcdc; text-align:center| Defenders

|-
! colspan=14 style=background:#dcdcdc; text-align:center| Midfielders

|-
! colspan=14 style=background:#dcdcdc; text-align:center| Forwards

|-
! colspan=14 style=background:#dcdcdc; text-align:center| Out on Loan

|-

Top scorers
Includes all competitive matches. The list is sorted by squad number when total goals are equal.

Last updated 27 April 2019.

References

Fulham F.C. seasons
Fulham
Fulham
Fulham